The following is an armorial of the individuals, who have served as governor-general of New Zealand.

Almost all governors-general have been granted armorial achievements, sometimes known as coats of arms.

The coats of arms of the governors-general from the Earl of Liverpool to Lord Galway were largely inherited, and so do not reflect on their lives or careers. However, those from the 1940s onwards begin to show more elements reflecting the connections between the office of governor-general and New Zealand.

Many of the armorial bearings since those of Sir Denis Blundell have been designed, in whole or in part, by Phillip O'Shea, New Zealand Herald of Arms Extraordinary.

Coats of arms of governors-general

Coats of arms of governors
Several governors of New Zealand also had, mostly inherited, armorial bearings.

See also

List of governors-general of New Zealand
New Zealand heraldry
Coat of arms of New Zealand
Roll of arms
Armorial of the governors-general of Australia
Armorial of the Governors General of Canada
Armorial of prime ministers of the United Kingdom
Armorial of the speakers of the British House of Commons

Notes

References

External links
Official Website of the Governor-General of New Zealand
Government House carved coats of arms

Governors-General of New Zealand
New Zealand heraldry